The Dominican Summer League Braves or DSL Braves is a minor league baseball team in the Dominican Summer League. The team plays in the San Pedro de Macorís division and is affiliated with the Atlanta Braves.

History
The team came into existence in 1989 and has been an independent Braves affiliate ever since, with only one exception.  For the 1994 season, the team shared an affiliation with the Texas Rangers.  From 2001 to 2005, the team split into two squads as DSL Braves 1 and DSL Braves 2, but became a unified team again for the 2006 season.

Roster

References

External links
DSL Braves on SABR Minor Leagues Database

Atlanta Braves minor league affiliates
Baseball teams in the Dominican Republic
Dominican Summer League teams